Jay W. Christopher is chairman and founder of “Thatcher Corporation” of Naperville, Illinois, a funder and incubator for start up companies.

In 1980 he was cofounder with his wife Doris of "The Pampered Chef” a direct sales company for fine kitchen tools. He served as executive vice president of corporate development. The company was sold to Berkshire Hathaway, Warren Buffett, in 2002. He previously held positions with the Hammond Organ Company, Keebler Co., Lien Services, Marian Joy Rehabilitation Hospital and founded Thatcher Technology Group, Inc.  

Jay and his wife Doris have a legacy of giving to many educational institutions including Valparaiso University projects such as the “Christopher Center for Library and Informational Resources”, the “Kallay-Christopher Geography and Meteorology Building”, the student union building and the athletic track at brown field.

Concordia University – Chicago was the recipient of the “Walter and Maxine Christopher Education and Early Childhood Development Center”.  At the University of Illinois, Champaign resides the “Doris Kelley Christopher Family Resiliency Center” dedicated to the study of family life.

Christopher is a 1967 graduate of Valparaiso University.

Christopher is chairman of the Chicagoland Lutheran Educational Foundation. A member of numerous other civic and professional organizations, Christopher was the 2000 Entrepreneur of the Year for the National Foundation for Teaching Entrepreneurship, and was the recipient of an honorary doctor of laws degree from Valparaiso University in 1999. He continues to serve as a member of the National Council of Valpo's College of Business Administration.

He and his former wife Doris have a legacy of giving to Valparaiso University. They were the principal donors, contributing $15 million to the Christopher Center for Library and Information Resources, and contributed significantly to the Kallay-Christopher Geography and Meteorology building. They have also donated generously to the National Foundation for Teaching Entrepreneurship, with over $250,000 given. Christopher and his wife divorced in 2012. They resided in Hinsdale, Illinois.

References

Living people
Valparaiso University alumni
Year of birth missing (living people)